The Islamic Association of Engineers is a civic and professional association in Iran founded in 1957.

The organization is a platform for Islamic modernist activists and a forum for debating key issues among them. It holds regular meetings, lectures and research and turns them into books.

Mehdi Bazargan and Ezzatollah Sahabi were among its founders. Alongside Islamic Association of Students, the organization was active against outreach of Marxist ideology before Iranian Revolution and was one of the professional bodies that served as a platform for religious activism, playing an important role in shaping the Islamic ideology of the revolution. Ali Shariati was among occasional lecturers at the organization. A number of leading members in the association held government portfolios during Interim Government of Iran.

References 

1957 establishments in Iran
Islamic political organizations
Engineering societies
Islamic organisations based in Iran
Professional associations based in Iran
Organizations established in 1957
Freedom Movement of Iran